Kuyupınar can refer to:

 Kuyupınar, Bozüyük
 Kuyupınar, Göynük
 Kuyupınar, Ilgaz